Towhan (also Romanized as Ţowhān; also known as Tehun, Toohan Olya, Toohan Sofla, Ţowhān-e Jīroft, Ţūjān, Ţūjān-e Jīroft, Ţūjān-e ‘Olyā, and Ţūjān-e Soflā) is a village in Dowlatabad Rural District, in the Central District of Jiroft County, Kerman Province, Iran. At the 2006 census, its population was 1,335, in 281 families.

References 

Populated places in Jiroft County